Zarrinabad (also Romanized as Zarrīnābād, Zarrīn Ābād, and Zerrīnābād) is a village in Akhtarabad Rural District, in the Central District of Malard County, Tehran Province, Iran. At the 2006 census, its population was 94, in 28 families.

References 

Populated places in Malard County